Flexivirga endophytica is an endophytic, Gram-positive, aerobic and non-motile bacterium from the genus Flexivirga which has been isolated from a leaf of the plant Ocimum basilicum.

References

External links
Type strain of Flexivirga endophytica at BacDive -  the Bacterial Diversity Metadatabase

Micrococcales
Bacteria described in 2016